is a railway station in the city of Motosu, Gifu Prefecture, Japan, operated by the private railway operator Tarumi Railway.

Lines

Station layout
Itonuki Station has one ground-level side platform serving a single bi-directional track. The station is unattended.

Adjacent stations

|-
!colspan=5|Tarumi Railway

History
Itonuki Station opened on March 20, 1956.

Surrounding area
The station is located in a rural area surrounded by farms.

See also
 List of Railway Stations in Japan

References

External links

 

Railway stations in Gifu Prefecture
Railway stations in Japan opened in 1956
Stations of Tarumi Railway
Motosu, Gifu